The 2006 Florida Commissioner of Agriculture election took place on November 7, 2006, to elect the Florida Commissioner of Agriculture. Charles H. Bronson won a second term.

Republican

Democratic

General Election

References

https://web.archive.org/web/20110718141934/https://doe.dos.state.fl.us/elections/resultsarchive/Index.asp?ElectionDate=11%2F7%2F2006&DATAMODE=

Florida Commissioner of Agriculture elections
Commissioner of Agriculture
Florida Commissioner of Agriculture